Racherla is a village in Prakasam district of the Indian state of Andhra Pradesh. It is the mandal headquarters of Racharla mandal in Markapur revenue division.

Geography 
It has an average elevation of 224 metres (738 feet).

References 

Villages in Prakasam district